Rachel B White is an Indian actress and artist who works in Hindi and Bengali films. She has appeared in the Bollywood film Ungli (2014); and Bengali films  Har Har Byomkesh (2015 ), Devi (2017) and One (2017).

Early life
Born in Kolkata, India, she completed her schooling from Loreto Convent School,Kolkata and later graduated with a degree in English (Honours) from the University of Calcutta.

Career
In 2014, Rachel White debuted in Bollywood with Emraan Hashmi, Sanjay Dutt, Kangana Ranaut and Neha Dhupia in the film Ungli where she was cast opposite Emraan Hashmi. She appeared in the Bengali films Har Har Byomkesh (2015), Devi (2017) and One (2017).
White has modeled for brands such as Pond's, Garnier, MRF Tyres, Axis Bank, Airtel, Kotak Mahindra, ICICI Bank. White replaced Sonali Raut in the sitcom web series Love, Life and Screw Ups, starring Zeenat Aman, Zarina Wahab, Dolly Thakore and Sushant Divgikar.
Rachel collaborated with a USA based fashion brand Yog The Label selling her pictures featured products manufactured in USA and Europe worldwide.

MeToo activism
On 12 October 2018, White disclosed allegations against film director Sajid Khan as part of the MeToo movement in Bollywood. Another actress, Saloni Chopra, and White's allegations against him led Khan to step down from directing the film Housefull 4 and being suspended from the Indian Film and Television Directors Association (IFTDA) for a year due to multiple sexual harassment allegations.

Filmography

Web series

References

External links

 Rachel White's Interview at Times of India

Living people
21st-century Indian actresses
University of Calcutta alumni
Actresses in Hindi cinema
Actresses in Bengali cinema
Actresses in Telugu cinema
Indian film actresses
Actresses from Kolkata
Female models from Kolkata
Year of birth missing (living people)